Polyphemus is a circa 1512 fresco by Sebastiano del Piombo in the Villa Chigi, next to Raphael's Triumph of Galatea and continuing its iconography.

References

Paintings depicting Greek myths
Paintings by Sebastiano del Piombo
Fresco paintings in Rome
1512 paintings